Gymnobela fulvotincta is a species of sea snail, a marine gastropod mollusk in the family Raphitomidae.

Description
The length of the shell attains 33 mm, its diameter 13 mm.

The spire of the rather solid shell is composed of 9 whorls, separated by a well marked suture. The whorls of the protoconch consist of curved longitudinal ribs and are, at the bottom, finely reticulated. A little below the middle of the subsequent whorls, occur a series of longitudinal, tuberculous plicae. These tubercles are protruding, rounded, very regularly arranged and give the whorls a streamlined appearance. There are 15 plicae on the penultimate whorl, 20 on the body whorl These plicae do not extend to the suture. On the body whorl however, they continue downward in an obsolete manner. The infra-sutural zone, is wide, sloping, with very arched growth lines, a little more developed close to the suture. The whole surface, with the exception of the infra-sutural zone, is crossed by small, thin, and regular growth lines, a little less wide than their intervals. The aperture is elongated, angular at the apex, attenuated at the base where it is prolonged into a mediocre, well open and not reflected siphonal canal. The columella is very slightly twisted. The outer lip is simple, arched and is broadly, but not deeply indented at the top.

Distribution
This marine species occurs off the Azores and the Cape Verdes.

References

 Sysoev A.V. (2014). Deep-sea fauna of European seas: An annotated species check-list of benthic invertebrates living deeper than 2000 m in the seas bordering Europe. Gastropoda. Invertebrate Zoology. Vol.11. No.1: 134–155 
 Gofas, S.; Le Renard, J.; Bouchet, P. (2001). Mollusca. in: Costello, M.J. et al. (eds), European Register of Marine Species: a check-list of the marine species in Europe and a bibliography of guides to their identification. Patrimoines Naturels. 50: 180-213

External links
 
 Bouchet & Warren, Revision of the North-East Atlantic bathyal and abyssal Turridae (Mollusca, Gastropoda); The Journal of Molluscan Studies, supplement 8, December 1980

fulvotincta
Gastropods described in 1896